Pseudanthias hawaiiensis, the Hawaiian longfin anthias, is a small colorful species of fish in the subfamily Anthiinae. It is often treated as a subspecies of P. ventralis, but some authorities prefer to treat them as separate species.

It reaches  in length and is bright yellow, orange, red and purple. It occasionally makes its way into the aquarium trade, but it is a difficult species to maintain.

References

 http://www.pearsonsuccessnet.com/ebook/products/0-13-190303-9/view1_sx05_hart111.pdf

hawaiiensis
Fish of the Pacific Ocean
Taxa named by John Ernest Randall
Fish described in 1979